The North Caucasus, or Ciscaucasia, is a subregion of Eastern Europe in the Eurasian continent. It is the northern part of the wider Caucasus region, and is entirely a part of Russia, sandwiched between the Sea of Azov and Black Sea to the west, and the Caspian Sea to the east. The region shares land borders with Georgia and Azerbaijan to the south. Krasnodar is the largest city within the North Caucasus.

Politically, the North Caucasus is made up of Russian republics and krais. It lies north of the Main Caucasian Range, which separates it from the South Caucasus. As part of Russia, the territory falls within the North Caucasian and Southern Federal Districts and consists of Krasnodar Krai, Stavropol Krai, and the constituent republics, approximately from west to east: the Republic of Adygea, Karachay-Cherkessia, Kabardino-Balkaria, North Ossetia–Alania, Ingushetia, Chechnya, and Republic of Dagestan and to the north: Kalmykia.

Geographically, the term North Caucasus also refers to the northern slope and western extremity of the Greater Caucasus mountain range, as well as a part of its southern slope to the West. The Pontic–Caspian steppe area is often also encompassed under the notion of "Ciscaucasus", thus the northern boundary of the Forecaucasus steppe is generally considered to be the Manych River. Owing to its mild climate compared to much of Russia, the region has been described as Russia's "sunbelt".

History
Ancient cultures of the Northern Caucasus are known as Klin-Yar community, with the most notable culture being the ancient Koban culture. Other haplogroups were Haplogroup J1 and Haplogroup G-M285.

Ciscaucasus was historically covered by the Pontic–Caspian steppe, mostly on fertile calcareous chernozyom soils, which has been almost completely tilled and grazed. It is bounded by the Sea of Azov on the west, and the Caspian Sea on the east. According to the Concise Atlas of the World, Second Edition (2008), the Ciscaucasus region lies on the European side of the "commonly-accepted division" that separates Europe from Asia.

The Northern Caucasus was conquered by Russia after the Russo-Circassian War. Much of the Northern Caucasus seceded from Russia in March 1917 as the Mountainous Republic of the Northern Caucasus, taking advantage of the instability caused by the February Revolution and becoming a minor participant in the Russian Civil War. Mountainous Republic troops engaged in fierce clashes against the invading White General Anton Denikin's Volunteer Army, before the latter's defeat at the hands of the Red Army. The region was informally occupied by the Soviet Union shortly afterwards, and the republic was forced into accepting a nonviolent annexation in January 1921. It was reformed into the Mountainous ASSR, which was later dissolved in October 1924, replaced by a series of autonomous Okrugs and Oblasts.

The outer border of the Soviet Union's North Caucasus Krai was the same as that of present-day North Caucasus Economic Region (Raion) which includes an oblast (Rostov Oblast), two krais (Krasnodar Krai and Stavropol Krai), and seven republics. The former North Caucasus Military District (Okrug) also included Astrakhan Oblast, Volgograd Oblast, and the Republic of Kalmykia. Its administrative center was Rostov-on-Don until 10 January 1934, Pyatigorsk until January 1936, then Ordzhonikidze (today Vladikavkaz) and, from 15 December 1936, Voroshilovsk (today Stavropol).

In June 2022, the US State Department advised citizens not to travel to the North Caucasus, including Chechnya and Mount Elbrus, due to terrorism, kidnapping, and risk of civil unrest.

Life expectancy 

The North Caucasus, especially in its mountainous territories, has the highest life expectancy in Russia. The region is known for a large number of centenarians.

Gallery

See also
 Caucasus
 Confederation of Mountain Peoples of the Caucasus
 Dolmens of the North Caucasus
 Insurgency in the North Caucasus
 Kuban People's Republic
 Mountain Autonomous Soviet Socialist Republic
 Mountainous Republic of the Northern Caucasus
 North Caucasian Federal District
 North Caucasian Soviet Republic
 North Caucasus economic region
 North Caucasian Federal University
 North Caucasian Krai
 North Caucasian Military District
 North Caucasian Railway
 Southern Federal District

References

Notes

Further reading
 In Quest for God and Freedom: Sufi Responses to the Russian Advance in the North Caucasus by Anna Zelkina
 Russia in the Modern World: A New Geography by Denis J. B. Shaw, Institute of British Geographers

External links
 History of the Caucasus 
 
 
 Relations between The North and South Caucasus. Articles in the Caucasus Analytical Digest No. 27

North Caucasus
Caucasus
Eastern Europe
Southern Russia
Regions of Russia
Regions of Eurasia